Paul Allen Catlin ( – ) was a mathematician, professor of mathematics who worked in graph theory and number theory. He wrote a significant paper on the series of chromatic numbers and Brooks' theorem, titled  Hajós graph coloring conjecture: variations and counterexamples.

Career

Originally from Bridgeport, Connecticut, Catlin majored in Mathematics with a B.A. degree from Carnegie Mellon University in 1970.

Catlin held a Doctorate in Mathematics degree from Ohio State University. From 1972 to 1973, he was a research and teaching assistant at Ohio State University, where he earned the Master of Science degree in Mathematics.

In 1976, he went to work at Wayne State University, where he concentrated the research on chromatic numbers and Brooks' theorem.

He authored over fifty academic papers in number theory and graph theory. Many of his contributions and collaborations have been published in The Fibonacci Quarterly, in The Journal of Number Theory, in the Journal of Discrete Mathematics, and many other academic publications. He co-authored scholarly papers with Arthur M. Hobbs, Béla Bollobás and Paul Erdős, Hong-Jian Lai, Zheng-Yiao Han, and Yehong Shao, among others. He also published papers with G. Neil Robertson, with whom he also completed his dissertation thesis in 1976.

Selected publications

References

1948 births
1995 deaths
20th-century American mathematicians
Number theorists
Graph theorists
Ohio State University Graduate School alumni
Wayne State University faculty